Kenneth Cicilia (born 26 December 1981 in Willemstad, Curaçao, in the former Netherlands Antilles) is a Curaçao football player.

Club career
Cicilia came through the youth ranks at PSV Eindhoven  and started his professional played at Sparta Rotterdam in the Dutch Eredivisie. He later played for FC Haarlem and TOP Oss in the Dutch Eerste Divisie as well as a couple of seasons for KV Turnhout in Belgium.

He returned to amateur football in the Netherlands to play for VV UNA and Dijkse Boys. In June 2012 he moved to Brabantia.

References

External links 
 

1981 births
Living people
People from Willemstad
Association football midfielders
Curaçao footballers
Curaçao international footballers
Dutch Antillean footballers
Sparta Rotterdam players
TOP Oss players
HFC Haarlem players
KFC Turnhout players
Eredivisie players
Eerste Divisie players
Expatriate footballers in Belgium
VV UNA players